Coelioxys confusa is a species of leaf-cutting bee in the genus Coelioxys, of the family Megachilidae. It is found in Himachal Pradesh, India, and while recordings from Sri Lanka are uncertain, they are considered to be true.

Notes

References
 http://www.atlashymenoptera.net/biblio/Karunaratne_et_al_2006_Sri_Lanka.pdf
 https://www.academia.edu/7390502/AN_UPDATED_CHECKLIST_OF_BEES_OF_SRI_LANKA_WITH_NEW_RECORDS
 http://beesind.com/beesind2/coelioxys.htm

confusa
Hymenoptera of Asia
Insects of India
Insects described in 1854